Cantachiaro was an Italian weekly satirical magazine which had a radical anti-Fascist stance. The magazine was in circulation between 1944 and 1948 and was based in Rome, Italy.

History and profile
Cantachiaro was launched shortly after the liberation of Rome from the Fascist forces in 1944. The founders were Raffaello Ferruzzi and Franco Monicelli. The latter also edited the magazine which was headquartered in Rome. It was published on a weekly basis and adopted a radical anti-Fascist stance. In December 1944 Cantachiaro published the speech of Benito Mussolini delivered in Milan in 1943. It was regarded as a sabotage by the communist newspaper l'Unità, and Cantachiaro was suspended by the Allies for one week for this publication. Cantachiaro published cartoons of the politicians, including Prime Minister Ferruccio Parri. The magazine folded in 1948.

Legacy
In September 1944 a musical satirical theatre group was named after the magazine. It was started by two magazine contributors, namely Pietro Garinei and Sandro Giovannini.

References

1944 establishments in Italy
1948 disestablishments in Italy
Anti-fascism in Italy
Censorship in Italy
Comics magazines published in Italy
Defunct magazines published in Italy
Humor magazines
Italian-language magazines
Italian political satire
Magazines established in 1944
Magazines disestablished in 1948
Magazines published in Rome
Satirical magazines published in Italy
Weekly magazines published in Italy